U train may refer to:
 The London Underground
 Underground Railroad